Siedove is an urban-type settlement in Kalmiuske Raion, Donetsk Oblast, Ukraine, but was formerly part of Novoazovsk Raion. Siedove is about 7 km away from Novoazovsk. It is currently controlled by the Donetsk People's Republic. Population is  

The settlement is named after Georgy Yakovlevich Sedov (1877–1914), a Russian Arctic explorer.

References 

Urban-type settlements in Kalmiuske Raion